Wrexham city centre is the administrative, cultural and historic city centre of Wrexham, in North Wales and is the area enclosed by the inner ring road of the city. It is the largest shopping area in north and mid Wales, and the administrative centre of Wrexham County Borough. Many of its streets are pedestrianised.

Geography 
The area encompassed by the inner ring road is Grosvenor Road, Powell Road, Bodhyfryd, St. Georges Crescent (The Beast Market), Smithfield Road, Eagles Meadow, Salop Road, St Giles Way, Pen-Y-Bryn, Ruthin Road, Bradley Road and Watery Road. It is primarily urban in nature, with the exception of the city centre's largest green space at Belle-Vue Park. The area is predominantly non-residential, notable exceptions being Eagles Meadow and around Parciau.

History 

The city centre is Wrexham's medieval core, and as such contains most of its history. The city centre expands outwards from the hill top St. Giles Church, which itself is surrounded by a number of small medieval streets and alleyways.

Areas 
Whilst the term 'City Centre' can be used quite liberally in Wrexham, it can be split into a number of smaller distinct areas, which have their own character and purpose within the city. Some of these are officially recognised by Wrexham Council, others are more a description of distinct areas.

The High Street and St. Giles 

This is Wrexham's original city centre, beginning at the church of St Giles. This area was once the traditional High Street of the city containing most of its traditional shops and markets. It is now home to most of Wrexham's night-life including clubs, bars and restaurants. During the day the main attractions are the area's cafes and the historic 'Butchers Market' hall situated on High Street. The church of St Giles is one of the Seven Wonders of Wales and often noted as the finest example of Gothic architecture in Wales. It is also home to the tomb of Elihu Yale.

Eagles Meadow 

Eagle's Meadow is an open-air shopping centre in the south-east of the city centre. Opened in 2008, the complex is situated between Yorke Street and the inner ring road at Smithfield. The area incorporates a number of new buildings and public spaces, and includes a bridge to Yorke Street and an entrance in the style of the 'Spanish Steps' in Rome. Eagle's Meadow holds many top highstreet chain stores over two levels, alongside an 8-screen cinema and 24-lane 10 pin bowling alley. It occupies the site of a former car-park and Asda superstore.

Civic Centre 
Formerly known as the Civic Centre this quarter of the city centre can be thought of as everything north of Holt and Lampbit Street and east of Rhosddu Road. The area is bisected north to south by Chester Street. The area consists almost entirely of public services, arts and media centres. It is home to Wrexham County Borough Council HQ, North Wales Police (Eastern Division) HQ, BBC Wales (Wrexham) Studios, ITV Wales (Wrexham Bureau), Library and Arts Centre, Yale College of Wrexham, Wrexham Waterworld and a number of criminal and civil law courts. The area is also home to Llwyn Isaf, one of the city centre's largest green areas.

Island Green 
Formerly an industrial area the location was home to the Island Green Brewery and Wrexham Central railway station. It is now a shopping area, developed in the late 1990s. The old oast houses used in the Brewery are now converted into apartments aside the River Gwenfro, which cuts through the shopping area. During re-development the railway station was moved 500 yards west, and the station now sits inside the shopping area. Trains run from Wrexham Central to local suburban stations, Deeside, the Wirral and Wrexham General for connections onto inter-city services.

Main shopping area 
The main arteries of the city centre link all previous areas. Running in an easterly direction from Grosvenor Road, Regent Street and Hope Street are the main shopping streets within the city, terminating at the base of St Giles' Church on High Street. Leading off these streets are a number of other streets, including Queen Street. The majority of this area is pedestrianised, and contains a number of notable landmarks including the thatched 'Horse & Jockey' pub and mock Tudor architecture at Hope St/Queen St.

Queens Square 
The square is the focal point in the city centre. It plays host to daily events, Christmas celebrations and weekly markets. The square merges with Llwyn Isaf.

Parciau (Including Pen-y-Bryn) 

Parciau is the name given to the southernmost area of the city centre. Much of the area is covered by Belle Vue Park, Wrexham, a substantial Victorian park built to commemorate the Jubilee of Wrexham's charter. The park is known for its bowl, which holds many summer musical events. Bridge Street, Pen-y-Bryn and Ruthin road all come under the Parciau area.

References

Areas of Wrexham
Central business districts in the United Kingdom